The National Order of the Legion of Honour, formerly the Royal Order of the Legion of Honour, is the highest French order of merit, both military and civil. Established in 1802 by Napoleon Bonaparte, it has been retained (with occasional slight alterations) by all later French governments and regimes.

History

Consulate
During the French Revolution, all of the French orders of chivalry were abolished and replaced with Weapons of Honour. It was the wish of Napoleon Bonaparte, the First Consul, to create a reward to commend civilians and soldiers.

Napoleon originally created this award to ensure political loyalty. The organization would be used as a façade to give political favours, gifts, and concessions. The  was loosely patterned after a Roman legion, with legionaries, officers, commanders, regional "cohorts" and a grand council. The members were paid, the highest of them extremely generously:

Napoleon famously declared, "You call these baubles, well, it is with baubles that men are led... Do you think that you would be able to make men fight by reasoning? Never. That is good only for the scholar in his study. The soldier needs glory, distinctions, rewards." This has been often quoted as "It is with such baubles that men are led." Napoleon was also occasionally noted after a battle to ask who the bravest man in a regiment was, and upon the regiment declaring the individual, the Emperor would take the Legion d’Honneur of his own coat and pin it on the chest of the man.

The order was the first modern order of merit. Under the monarchy, such orders were often limited to Roman Catholics, all knights had to be noblemen, and military decorations were restricted to officers. The , however, was open to men of all ranks and professions; only merit or bravery counted.
The badge of the  has five arms.

First Empire

After Napoleon crowned himself Emperor of the French in 1804 and established the Napoleonic nobility in 1808, award of the  gave right to the title of "Knight of the Empire". The title was made hereditary after three generations of grantees.

Napoleon had dispensed 15 golden collars of the  among his family and his senior ministers. This collar was abolished in 1815.

Although research is made difficult by the loss of the archives, it is rumoured that three women who fought with the army were decorated with the order: Virginie Ghesquière, Marie-Jeanne Schelling and a nun, Sister Anne Biget.

The  was prominent and visible in the French Empire. The Emperor always wore it, and the fashion of the time allowed for decorations to be worn most of the time. The king of Sweden therefore declined the order; it was too common in his eyes. Today, they are in Moscow.

Restoration of the Bourbon King of France in 1814

Louis XVIII changed the appearance of the order, but it was not abolished. To have done so would have angered the 35,000 to 38,000 members. The images of Napoleon and his eagle were removed and replaced by the image of King Henry IV, the popular first king of the Bourbon line. Three Bourbon  replaced the eagle on the reverse of the order. A king's crown replaced the imperial crown. In 1816, the grand cordons were renamed grand crosses and the legionnaires became knights. The king decreed that the commandants were now commanders. The  became the second-ranking order of knighthood of the French monarchy, after the Order of the Holy Spirit.

July Monarchy

The insignia were drastically altered; the cross now displayed tricolour flags. In 1847, there were 47,000 members.

Second Republic
A nephew of the founder, Louis-Napoléon Bonaparte, was elected president and he restored the image of his uncle on the crosses of the order. In 1852, the first recorded woman, Angélique Duchemin, an old revolutionary of the 1789 uprising against the absolute monarchy, was admitted into the order. On 2 December 1851, President Louis-Napoléon Bonaparte staged a coup d'état with the help of the armed forces. He made himself Emperor of the French exactly one year later on 2 December 1852, after a successful plebiscite.

Second Empire
An Imperial crown was added. During Napoleon III's reign, the first American was admitted: Thomas Wiltberger Evans, dentist of Napoleon III.

Third Republic

In 1870, the defeat of the French Imperial Army in the Franco-Prussian War brought the end of the Empire and the creation of the Third Republic (1871–1940). As France changed, the  changed as well. The crown was replaced by a laurel and oak wreath.

Grévy was not accused of personal participation in this scandal, but he was slow to accept his indirect political responsibility, which caused his eventual resignation on 2 December 1887.

During World War I, some 55,000 decorations were conferred, 20,000 of which went to foreigners. The large number of decorations resulted from the new posthumous awards authorised in 1918. Traditionally, membership in the  could not be awarded posthumously.

Fourth and Fifth Republics
The establishment of the Fourth Republic in 1946 brought about the latest change in the design of the Legion of Honour. The date "1870" on the obverse was replaced by a single star. No changes were made after the establishment of the Fifth Republic in 1958.

Organization

Legal status and leadership
The Legion of Honour is a national order of France, meaning a public incorporated body. The Legion is regulated by a civil law code, the "Code of the Legion of Honour and of the Military Medal". While the President of the French Republic is the Grand Master of the order, day-to-day running is entrusted to the Grand Chancery.

Grand Master

Since the establishment of the Legion, the Grand Master of the order has always been the Emperor, King or President of France. President Emmanuel Macron therefore became the Grand Master of the Legion on 14 May 2017.

The Grand Master appoints all other members of the order, on the advice of the French government. The Grand Master's insignia is the Grand Collar of the Legion. The President of the Republic, as Grand Master of the order, receives the Collar as part of his investiture, but the Grand Masters have not worn the Collar since Valéry Giscard d'Estaing.

The Grand Chancery
The Grand Chancery is headed by the Grand Chancellor, usually a retired general, and the Secretary General, a civilian administrator.
 Grand Chancellor: General Benoît Puga (since 23 August 2016)
 Secretary-General: Luc Fons (since 2007)

There are several structures funded by and operated under the authority of the Grand Chancery, like the Legion of Honour Schools and the Legion of Honour Museum. The Legion of Honour Schools are élite boarding schools in Saint-Denis and Camp des Loges in the forest of Saint-Germain-en-Laye.

Membership

There are five classes in the Legion of Honour:

  (Knight): minimum 20 years of public service or 25 years of professional activity with "eminent merits"
  (Officer): minimum 8 years in the rank of 
  (Commander): minimum 5 years in the rank of 
  (Grand Officer): minimum 3 years in the rank of 
  (Grand Cross): minimum 3 years in the rank of 

The "eminent merits" required to be awarded the order require the flawless performance of one's trade as well as doing more than ordinarily expected, such as being creative, zealous and contributing to the growth and well-being of others.

The order has a maximum quota of 75 Grand Cross, 250 Grand Officers, 1,250 Commanders, 10,000 Officers, and 113,425 (ordinary) Knights.  the actual membership was 67 Grand Cross, 314 Grand Officers, 3,009 Commanders, 17,032 Officers and 74,384 Knights. Appointments of veterans of World War II, French military personnel involved in the North African Campaign and other foreign French military operations, as well as wounded soldiers, are made independently of the quota.

Members convicted of a felony ( in French) are automatically dismissed from the order. Members convicted of a misdemeanour ( in French) can be dismissed as well, although this is not automatic.

Wearing the decoration of the  without having the right to do so is a serious offence. Wearing the ribbon or rosette of a foreign order is prohibited if that ribbon is mainly red, like the ribbon of the Legion of Honour. French military personnel in uniform must salute other military members in uniform wearing the medal, whatever the  rank and the military rank of the bearer. This is not mandatory with the ribbon. In practice, however, this is rarely done.

There is not a single, complete list of all the members of the Legion in chronological order. The number is estimated at one million, including about 2,900 Knights Grand Cross.

French nationals
In practice, in current usage, the order is conferred on entrepreneurs, high-level civil servants, scientists, artists, including famous actors and actresses, sport champions, and others with connections in the executive. Members of the French Parliament cannot receive the order, except for valour in war, and ministers are not allowed to nominate their accountants.

To be promoted to a higher class, one had to perform new eminent services in the interest of France and a set number of years had to pass between appointment and promotion. This was however amended in 2008 when entry became possible at Officer, Commander and Grand Officer levels, as a recognition of "extraordinary careers". In 2009, Simone Veil became the first person to enter the Order at Grand Officer level. She was promoted to Grand Cross in 2012.

Every year at least five recipients decline the award. Even if they refuse to accept it, they are still included in the order's official membership. The composers Maurice Ravel and Charles Koechlin, for example, declined the award when it was offered to them.

Non-French recipients

Foreign nationals who live in France are subject to the same requirements as the French. Foreign heads of state and their spouses or consorts of monarchs are made Grand Cross as a courtesy. American and British veterans who served in either World War on French soil, or during the 1944 campaigns to liberate France, may be eligible for appointment as Chevalier of the Legion of Honour, provided they were still living when the honour was approved.

Collective awards
Collective appointments can be made to cities, institutions or companies. A total of 64 settlements in France have been decorated, as well as six foreign cities: Liège in 1914, Belgrade in 1920, Luxembourg City in 1957, Volgograd (the World War II 'Stalingrad') in 1984, Algiers in 2004, and London in 2020. French towns display the decoration in their municipal coat of arms.

Military awards

The military distinctions are awarded for bravery or for service.

This is the top valour award in France. It is rarely awarded, mainly to soldiers who have died in battle.

French service-members
NCOs almost never achieve that award, except for the most heavily decorated service members.

Collective military awards
Collective appointments can be made to military units. Twenty-one schools, mainly schools providing reserve officers during the World Wars, were awarded the Légion d'Honneur. Foreign military units can be decorated with the order, such as the U.S. Military Academy.

The Flag or Standard of the following units was decorated with the Cross of a Knight of the Legion of Honour:

 1st Foreign Regiment
 1st Marine Artillery Regiment
 1st Marine Infantry Regiment
 1st Marine Infantry Parachute Regiment
 1st Photographic Technical Unit (USAAF Forward-deployed Reconnaissance Unit)
 1st Parachute  Regiment
 1st Regiment of African 
 1st Regiment of Algerian 
 1st Regiment of Riflemen
 1st Regiment of Senegalese 
 1st Train Regiment
 2nd Foreign Parachute Regiment
 2nd Marine Infantry Regiment
 2nd Regiment of Algerian 
 2nd Regiment of 
 3rd Algerian Infantry Regiment
 3rd Foreign Infantry Regiment
 3rd Regiment of 
 4th Tunisian Tirailleurs Regiment
 4th Regiment of 
 7th Algerian Infantry Regiment
 8th Infantry Regiment
 8th Zouaves Regiment
 9th Regiment of 
 11th Marine Artillery Regiment
 23rd Infantry Regiment
 23rd Marine Infantry Regiment
 24th Marine Infantry Regiment
 26th Infantry Regiment
 30th Battalion of 
 43rd Marine Infantry Regiment
 51st Infantry Regiment
 57th Infantry Regiment
 112th Line Infantry Regiment (French infantry regiment consisting of mostly Belgians, known as "The Victors of Raab")
 137th Infantry Regiment
 152nd Infantry Regiment
 153rd Infantry Regiment
 298th Infantry Regiment
 Fighter Squadron 1/30 Normandie-Niemen
  (Naval Infantry)
 Moroccan 
 Paris Fire Brigade
  (Colonial Infantry Regiment of Morocco). Book of the regiment will be fighting its most decorated emblem of the French army.

Classes and insignia

The order has had five levels since the reign of King Louis XVIII, who restored the order in 1815. Since the reform, the following distinctions have existed:

 Three ranks:
  (Knight): badge worn on left breast suspended from ribbon
  (Officer): badge worn on left breast suspended from a ribbon with a rosette
  (Commander): badge around neck suspended from ribbon necklet
 Two dignities:
  (Grand Officer): badge worn on left breast suspended from a ribbon (Officer), with star displayed on right breast

Due to the order's long history, and the remarkable fact that it has been retained by all subsequent governments and regimes since the First Empire, the order's design has undergone many changes. Although the basic shape and structure of the insignia has remained generally the same, the hanging device changed back and forth and France itself swung back and forth between republic and monarchy. The central disc in the centre has also changed to reflect the political system and leadership of France at the time. As each new regime came along the design was altered to become politically correct for the time, sometimes even changed multiple times during one historical era.

The badge is rendered in gilt (in silver for chevalier) enameled white, with an enameled laurel and oak wreath between the arms. The obverse central disc is in gilt, featuring the head of Marianne, surrounded by the legend  on a blue enamel ring. The reverse central disc is also in gilt, with a set of crossed , surrounded by the Légion's motto  (Honour and Country) and its foundation date on a blue enamel ring. The badge is suspended by an enameled laurel and oak wreath.

The star (or ) is worn by the Grand Cross (in gilt on the left chest) and the Grand Officer (in silver on the right chest) respectively; it is similar to the badge, but without enamel, and with the wreath replaced by a cluster of rays in between each arm. The central disc features the head of Marianne, surrounded by the legend  (French Republic) and the motto .

The ribbon for the medal is plain red.

The badge or star is not usually worn, except at the time of the decoration ceremony or on a dress uniform or formal wear. Instead, one normally wears the ribbon or rosette on their suit.

Except when wearing a dark suit with a lapel, women instead typically wear a small lapel pin called a barrette. Recipients purchase the special thread and barrettes at a store in Paris near the Palais Royal.

Gallery

See also

 List of  recipients by name
 List of foreign recipients of the 
 
 Ribbons of the French military and civil awards

References and notes
Notes

Citations

External links

 Official website
 Code de la légion d'honneur et de la médaille militaire, legifrance.gouv.fr 
 Base Léonore, recensement des récipiendaires de la Légion d'honneur (décédés avant 1977), on the website of the French Ministry of Culture 
 

 
1802 establishments in France
Awards established in 1802
Civil awards and decorations of France
French awards
Military awards and decorations of France
Orders of chivalry of France